Michael Stevens (born 7 November 1980) is a former Australian rules footballer who played for Port Adelaide and the Kangaroos in the Australian Football League (AFL).

Stevens was a member the Murray Bushrangers inaugural TAC Cup premiership in 1998 and was voted 'Best on Ground' in the Grand Final victory over the Geelong Falcons. On the back of his performances at Under-18 level, Stevens was the fifth player picked in the 1998 AFL draft. A wingman, he was unable to hold on to a spot in the Port Adelaide team although he did participate in their 2002 Wizard Cup triumph.

He joined his elder brother Anthony Stevens at the Kangaroos in 2003, after being traded for Stuart Cochrane. Stevens was a regular in the side throughout 2004 and missed just two games, polling his first and only Brownlow Medal votes when he was awarded three for a performance against Carlton. The following season he appeared in 19 of a possible 22 home and away matches and also took part in their Elimination Final loss to his old club, Port Adelaide. Stevens signed for Murray Football League team Mulwala in 2006.

In 2008, Stevens played for the Benalla Football Club in the Goulburn Valley Football League. Stevens then played for Yarrawonga, in the Ovens and Murray Football League, from 2009 to 2012, winning the 2009 Morris Medal, before retiring in early 2013.

References

Holmesby, Russell and Main, Jim (2007). The Encyclopedia of AFL Footballers. 7th ed. Melbourne: Bas Publishing.

1980 births
Living people
Port Adelaide Football Club players
Port Adelaide Football Club players (all competitions)
North Melbourne Football Club players
Murray Bushrangers players
Yarrawonga Football Club players
Benalla Football Club players
Australian rules footballers from Victoria (Australia)